Probatodes plumula is a species of beetle in the family Cerambycidae, and the only species in the genus Probatodes. It was described by Newman in 1851.

References

Lamiinae
Beetles described in 1851